The Board of Intermediate and Secondary Education, Dhaka, is an autonomous organization and responsible for holding public examinations (JSC, SSC and HSC). The board office is located at Bakshibazar, Dhaka.

History
Board of Intermediate and Secondary Education, Dhaka was established on 7 May 1921 according to the recommendation of Sadler Commission. Intermediate colleges and high schools in Dhaka city and Islamic intermediate colleges and high madrasah of greater Bengal were under control of that board. An advisory board made by the director of public education department of greater Bengal was given the authority to govern the board.

Dhaka Board was dissolved in September 1947 by a government order. Its name was changed to East Bengal Secondary Education Board in 1955 and it was live till 1961. Scope of this new board was limited to secondary level education of then the East province of Pakistan and control of intermediate education was shifted to the University of Dhaka.

Responsibility of intermediate education was given to the board from the university in 1961 and board was named Board of Intermediate and Secondary Education, East Pakistan and after liberation, it was named Board of Intermediate and Secondary Education, Dhaka with the scope of operation within Dhaka division.

District under Dhaka Education Board
Dhaka District
Faridpur District
Gazipur District
Gopalganj District, Bangladesh
Kishoreganj District
Madaripur District
Manikganj District
Munshiganj District
Narayanganj District
Narsingdi District
Rajbari District
Shariatpur District
Tangail District

See also
 List of Intermediate and Secondary Education Boards in Bangladesh

References

External links
 Official website

Education in Dhaka
1921 establishments in India
Education Board in Bangladesh
Government boards of Bangladesh